Glasgow Shettleston is a constituency of the Scottish Parliament (Holyrood), being one of eight constituencies within the Glasgow City council area. It elects one Member of the Scottish Parliament (MSP) by the plurality (first past the post) method of election. It is also one of nine constituencies in the Glasgow electoral region, which elects seven additional members, in addition to the nine constituency MSPs, to produce a form of proportional representation for the region as a whole.

The seat has been held by John Mason of the Scottish National Party since the 2011 Scottish Parliament election.

Electoral region 

The other eight constituencies of the Glasgow region are Glasgow Anniesland, Glasgow Cathcart, Glasgow Kelvin, Glasgow Maryhill and Springburn, Glasgow Pollok, Glasgow Provan, Glasgow Southside and Rutherglen.

The region covers the Glasgow City council area and a north-western portion of the South Lanarkshire council area.

Constituency boundaries 

The Glasgow Shettleston constituency was created at the same time as the Scottish Parliament, in 1999, with the name and boundaries of an  existing Westminster constituency. In 2005, however, Scottish Westminster (House of Commons) constituencies were mostly replaced with new constituencies.

Boundary review 

Following their First Periodic review into constituencies to the Scottish Parliament, the Boundary Commission for Scotland had recommended a modified Glasgow Shettleston constituency. The electoral wards used to create the newly formed Shettleston are:

In full: Calton, Shettleston
In part: Baillieston (shared with Glasgow Provan)

Member of the Scottish Parliament

Election results

2020s

2010s

2000s

1990s

 
 
 
 
 ,

See also
 Politics of Glasgow

Notes

External links

Constituencies of the Scottish Parliament
Politics of Glasgow
1999 establishments in Scotland
Constituencies established in 1999
Scottish Parliament constituencies and regions 1999–2011
Scottish Parliament constituencies and regions from 2011
Bridgeton–Calton–Dalmarnock
Parkhead
Baillieston